The Arnold Strongman Classic is an annual competition featuring strength athletes from all over the world, determining who is the Strongest Man in the World. Created by Arnold Schwarzenegger, Jim Lorimer and Terry Todd, it is an offshoot of the Arnold Sports Festival which takes place annually in Columbus, Ohio, USA. Widely regarded as the heaviest and the most difficult strongman competition in the world the Arnold Strongman Classic has been won only by 8 men in history. Among them, the Lithuanian Žydrūnas Savickas has won it 8 times, while the Icelander Hafþór Júlíus Björnsson and American Brian Shaw have won it 3 times each.

History 
The Arnold Strongman (which has been variously referred to as the "Arnold Classic", the "Arnold Classic Strongman", "Arnold's Summit" and "Arnold's Strongest Man") is one of the many offshoots of the Arnold festival. The Arnold Sports Festival, founded in 1989  as the Arnold Classic and named after Arnold Schwarzenegger, was originally a bodybuilding contest. It featured a competition for men (Arnold Classic) and women (Ms. International). The bodybuilding contests have since expanded to include a Fitness International and Figure International competition for women. However, the event had also expanded to include other sports and events, one of which was strongman, introduced in late 2002. This Strongman event was created by a powerlifter named Dr. Terry Todd at the request of Arnold Schwarzenegger. The expansion of the programme led to the Classic becoming the Arnold Fitness Weekend and now the Arnold Sports Festival. According to the Arnold Sports Festival co-producer, Jim Lorimer: "The Arnold Strongman Classic has been growing in popularity every year, and we are very excited that many strong men are returning."  January 29, 2008.

Championship History 
In the inaugural 2002 competition, the American professional wrestler and former weight lifter Mark Henry emerged victorious over Norway's Svend Karlsen. In addition to competing in what were the four official events — the Apollon's Wheel, the deadlift, the Hummer push and the 800+lbs Farmer's Walk — the competitors were given the opportunity to attempt to lift the Thomas Inch "unliftable" dumbbell or Inch Bell. A prize of $1000 was awarded to the man who could pull it the highest in the air. Five men chose to try the Bell with Mark Henry winning the $1000 by pulling it to the level of his chest.  Pfister raised the Inch Bell over his head with his right hand, to a standing ovation, but his lift was disqualified because he briefly stabilized the dumbbell with his left hand when it was on his knee and because he used a "continental clean" when raising the dumbbell to his chest.  Pfister was however also awarded $1000.

From 2003 to 2008, the Arnold Strongman was won every year by Žydrūnas Savickas of Lithuania (see Full results below). In 2008, he received a $40,000 check from Gerard Dente of MHP, an Audemars Piguet watch by Robert Ronan and the Louis Cyr trophy (after the legendary strongman, Louis Cyr) and congratulations from Governor Arnold Schwarzenegger. In the competition, 12 world records were set with Savickas setting three of them. In the Tire Deadlift, he lifted 1,027 lbs. In the Circus Dumbbell, he tied with Derek Poundstone for the world record with nine lifts each, and in the Manhood Stones, he lifted 525 lbs, three times. Second places were shared primarily between Svend Karlsen and Vasyl Virastyuk while Raimonds Bergmanis, Glenn Ross, Andrus Murumets and Mikhail Koklyaev shared the third places. 

American Derek Poundstone won in 2009 & 2010. Derek took the vacant throne from Zydrunas when he took 2009 off from the competition. When Savickas returned in 2010, Derek retained his title by defeating Zydrunas. Just days before the 2011 contest, 2-time defending champion Derek Poundstone was forced to withdraw from the contest due to injury. Fellow American big Brian Shaw came in and won the contest, and Mike Jenkins, the winner of the 2012 Arnold Strongman amateur event who was competing in his first-ever professional strongman competition, shocked many and finished in second place ahead of 6 time-champion Savickas who came in third. Mike Jenkins went on to win the title in 2012 ahead of Derek Poundstone by 1 point and Žydrūnas dropping to third. Lithuania's Vytautas Lalas won the competition in 2013 ahead of Brian Shaw by 0.5 point and Russia's Mikhail Koklyaev emerged third. From 2014 to 2017 the competition was won by either Zydrunas or Brian with two wins per each after very close battles, bringing their winning tallies to 8 and 3 respectively. the podiums were secured by Mike Burke, Mateusz Kieliszkowski, Vytautas Lalas and Hafþór Júlíus Björnsson.

In 2018, the Icelandic giant Hafþór Júlíus Björnsson reached his prime and dominated the competition for 3 consecutive years, winning the title in 2018, 2019 and 2020. Brian Shaw, Martins Licis, Mateusz Kieliszkowski and Mikhail Shivlyakov all had to settle with second and third places. Hafþór established new World Records in the Bag over bar, 500 kg Timber carry, Húsafell Stone carry, 400 lb Apollon's Axel for reps and twice broke the Elephant Bar Deadlift World Record with 472 kg (1,041 lb) in 2018 and 474 kg (1,045 lb) in 2019. Poland's Mateusz Kieliszkowski established world records in the Odd Haugen's Tombstone and Cyr Dumbbell while American Martins Licis established a world record in Conan's Wheel of Pain event. In 2021, the competition was not held due to COVID-19 pandemic. The 3 time defending champion Hafþór had retired from Strongman and Martins Licis won the competition in 2022 ahead of Ukraine's Oleksiy Novikov who emerged second.

Past winners

Winners breakdown

Regular events and world records
Timber Carry - Contestants have to lift heavy barn timbers bolted together and travel up an inclined ramp. In 2015 Hafþór Júlíus Björnsson  carried a 500 kg (1,102 lb) frame up a 35 feet ramp in 10.15 seconds, and in 2018 Jerry Pritchett  carried a 408 kg (900 lb) frame up a 35 feet ramp in 9.58 seconds. The event is also known as 'Frame Carry'.
Atlas Stones - Contestants have to lift heavy round concrete stones over a bar 4 feet in height. In 2017 Brian Shaw  hoisted a 254 kg (560 lb) stone over the bar.  
Apollon's Axle - A unique barbell made famous by the traditional strongman Louis "Apollon" Uni, reproduced by Ivanko Barbell Company, the Axle is a replica of the original with the same bar thickness, mechanically fastened to reproduction train wheels. Contestants must lift the wheels from the floor to overhead as many times as possible within a time frame. In 2002 Mark Henry  repped a 166 kg (366 lb) Axel 3 times, and in 2018 Hafþór Júlíus Björnsson  repped a 181 kg (400 lb) Axel 4 times.
Austrian Oak - A unique log named after Arnold Schwarzenegger's nickname which weighs anywhere from 195-204 kg (430-450 lb) where the athletes has to press for the maximum number of reps. A lighter Slater log which weighs 175 kg (386 lb) was also used for athletes who couldn't lift the Austrian Oak. In 2015 Žydrūnas Savickas  repped a 204 kg (450 lb) Austrian Oak 4 times.
Hummer Tire Deadlift - Contestants are required to lift a specially designed long bar weighted with tires from 15" height. The Tire Deadlift bar was designed and manufactured by Ivanko Barbell Company and comprises a 13 foot long stainless steel bar and up to eight Hummer tires & rims. Additional calibrated barbell plates may be added. In 2014 Žydrūnas Savickas  pulled 524 kg (1,155 lb) from a 15" height. 
Elephant Bar Deadlift - Contestants are required to lift a specially designed extra whipping long bar with Arnold Schwarzenegger inscribed weight plates from a standard 9" height. The apparatus was designed and manufactured by Rogue Fitness. In 2019 Hafþór Júlíus Björnsson  pulled 474 kg (1,045 lb) from the standard 9" height. 
Bale Tote - Contestants have to carry across their shoulders a heavy bar/yoke in a timed event. In 2017 Brian Shaw  carried a 710 kg (1,565 lb) yoke for 4 meters in 14.87 seconds and in 2014 Žydrūnas Savickas  carried a 640 kg (1,410 lb) yoke for 4 meters in 3.87 seconds. The event is also known as 'Super Yoke'.
Bag over Bar - Contestants have to throw heavy sandbags from 'a duck walk to an over head position' over a 15 foot bar. In 2017 Hafþór Júlíus Björnsson  threw a 45 kg (100 lb) bag over the 15 foot bar, and in 2019 a 25.5 kg (56 lb) Highland games weight (using only 1 arm) over a 20 foot 2 inch bar.
Circus Dumbbell - Lifting the classic heavy "Circus" dumbbell, used by professional Strongmen from the early 20th century including Louis Cyr. Richard Sorin reproduced the dumbbell for this event. The basic rule was to use one hand at a time and lift the dumbbell overhead either for max weight or for many reps as possible within a given time. In 2020 Mateusz Kieliszkowski  lifted a 145 kg (320 lb) dumbbell. 
Odd Haugen's Tombstone - Contestants have to hoist the legendary Odd Haugen's Tombstone which is weighing 190 kg (420 lb) to their shoulder for many reps as possible. In 2019 Mateusz Kieliszkowski  lifted the stone for 5 repetitions. 
Húsafell Stone - Contestants have to carry the legendary Húsafell Stone which weighs 186 kg (410 lb) around a structure which replicated the historical sheep and goat pen. In 2019 Hafþór Júlíus Björnsson  carried the stone for a distance of 218 feet 11 inches. 
Conan's Wheel of Pain - The event replicated the legendary grain mill from Conan the Barbarian (1982) where the contestants have to push a contraption which weighs 20,000 lbs around in a circle for time or distance and measured in either degrees or distance. The colossal contraption was replicated and built by Rogue Fitness. In 2019 Martins Licis  pushed the wheel for a distance of 119 feet 9 inches. 
Double T Squat - Contestants have to Squat a specially made curved bar to a platform and up for max weight. In 2022 Jean-Francois Caron  Squatted 438 kg (966 lb).

Full results

2002: Arnold Classic Strongman Competition 
Dates: 22, 23 February 2002

Columbus, Ohio:

2003: Arnold's Strength Summit 
Dates: 28 February, 1 March 2003

Columbus, Ohio:

2004: Arnold's Strongest Man 
Dates: 5, 6 March 2004

Columbus, Ohio:

2005: Arnold's Strongest Man 
Dates: 4, 5 March 2005

Columbus, Ohio:

2006: Arnold Strongman Classic 
Dates: 3, 4 March 2006

Columbus, Ohio:

2007: Arnold Strongman Classic 
Dates: 2–4 March 2007

Columbus, Ohio:

2008: Arnold Strongman Classic 
Dates: 29 February, 1 March 2008

Columbus, Ohio:

2009: Arnold Strongman Classic 
Dates: 6, 7 March 2009

Columbus, Ohio:

2010: Arnold Strongman Classic 
Dates: 5, 6 March 2010

Columbus, Ohio (Greater Columbus Convention Center, Arnold EXPO Stage)

2011: Arnold Strongman Classic 
Dates: 4, 5 March 2011

Columbus, Ohio (Greater Columbus Convention Center, Arnold EXPO Stage)

2012: Arnold Strongman Classic 
Dates: 2, 3 March 2012

Columbus, Ohio (Greater Columbus Convention Center, Arnold EXPO Stage)

2013: Arnold Strongman Classic 
Dates: 1, 2 March 2013

Columbus, Ohio (Greater Columbus Convention Center, Arnold EXPO Stage)

2014: Arnold Strongman Classic 
Dates: 1, 2 March 2014

Columbus, Ohio (Greater Columbus Convention Center, Arnold EXPO Stage)

2015: Arnold Strongman Classic 
Dates: 7, 8 March 2015

Columbus, Ohio (Greater Columbus Convention Center, Arnold EXPO Stage)

2016: Arnold Strongman Classic 
Dates: 4, 5 March 2016

Columbus, Ohio (Greater Columbus Convention Center, Arnold EXPO Stage)

2017: Arnold Strongman Classic 
Dates: 3, 4 March 2017

Columbus, Ohio (Greater Columbus Convention Center, Arnold EXPO Stage)

2018: Arnold Strongman Classic

Dates: 2, 3 March 2018

Columbus, Ohio (Greater Columbus Convention Center, Arnold EXPO Stage)

2019: Arnold Strongman Classic

Dates: 1, 2 March 2019

Columbus, Ohio (Greater Columbus Convention Center, Arnold EXPO Stage)

2020: Arnold Strongman Classic

Dates: 6, 7 March 2020

Columbus, Ohio (Greater Columbus Convention Center, Strongman Arena)

2022: Arnold Strongman Classic

Dates: 4, 5 March 2022

Columbus, Ohio (Greater Columbus Convention Center, Strongman Arena)

Arnold Strongman Classic-Europe 

In 2012, the inaugural "Arnold Strongman Classic-Europe" contest was formed and is a joint promotion between Arnold Schwarzenegger, Jim Lorimer (Arnold Sports Festival co-promoter), Dr. Rafael Santonja (president of the International Federation of Body Building, "IFBB") as well as American Strongman Corporation and Strongman Champions League.

The "Arnold Strongman Classic-Europe" contest will differ significantly from the format of the original Arnold Strongman Classic event, with less of an emphasis on brute strength and heavy events, and will include a wider variety of events and some speed/loading events similar to Strongman Champions League and World's Strongest Man contests. The format change is due largely in part to the event being broadcast and televised in 85 countries.

2012: Arnold Strongman Classic-Europe 
The 2012 contest was held in Madrid, Spain on Oct. 13 & 14, 2012, the event was sponsored by MHP. The contest is included as part of the 2012 Strongman Champions League season, and competitors earned points towards the annual SCL overall title. The inaugural contest was won by 6-time Arnold Strongman champion and reigning World's Strongest Man Zydrunas Savickas of Lithuania, who was also the 2012 SCL overall champion.

Dates: October 13–14, 2012
Madrid, Spain

2017: Arnold Strongman Classic-Europe

2018: Arnold Strongman Classic-Europe

2019: Arnold Strongman Classic-Europe

Arnold Strongman Classic Australia 

In 2015, the inaugural "Arnold Strongman Classic Australia" contest was formed, and is a joint promotion between Arnold Schwarzenegger, Jim Lorimer (Arnold Sports Festival co-promoter), Dr. Rafael Santonja (president of the International Federation of BodyBuilding & Fitness, "IFBB") as well as Australian Strongman Corporation and Strongman Champions League.

2015: Arnold Strongman Classic Australia

2016: Arnold Strongman Classic Australia

2017: Arnold Strongman Classic Australia

2018: Arnold Strongman Classic Australia

2019: Arnold Strongman Classic Australia

Arnold Amateur Strongman World Championships 
In 2010, the Arnold Amateur contest was formed by Dione Wessels. The contest is open to amateur strongman competitors from all over the world. The winner of the contest receives their pro card, and an invite to the next year's Arnold Strongman Classic event. Mike Jenkins won the inaugural contest in 2010,Mateusz Baron from Poland was the 2011 winner, and Adam Scherr was the 2012 winner.

2010: Arnold Amateur Strongman World Championships 
Dates: 7, 6 March 2010

Columbus, Ohio (Greater Columbus Convention Center, Arnold EXPO Stage)

2011: Arnold Amateur Strongman World Championships 
Dates: 5, 6 March 2011

Columbus, Ohio (Greater Columbus Convention Center, Arnold EXPO Stage)

2012: Arnold Amateur Strongman World Championships 
Dates: 3, 4 March 2012

Columbus, Ohio (Greater Columbus Convention Center, Arnold EXPO Stage)

2013: Arnold Amateur Strongman World Championships 
Dates: 1,2 March 2013

Columbus, Ohio (Greater Columbus Convention Center, Arnold EXPO Stage)

2014: Arnold Amateur Strongman World Championships 
Dates: 1,2 March 2014

Columbus, Ohio (Greater Columbus Convention Center, Arnold EXPO Stage)

2015: Arnold Amateur Strongman World Championships 
Dates:  7,8 March 2015

Columbus, Ohio (Greater Columbus Convention Center, Arnold EXPO Stage)

2016: Arnold Amateur Strongman World Championships 
Dates:  4, 5 March 2016

Columbus, Ohio (Greater Columbus Convention Center, Arnold EXPO Stage)

2017: Arnold Amateur Strongman World Championships 
Dates:  1,2 March 2017

Columbus, Ohio (Greater Columbus Convention Center, Arnold EXPO Stage)

2018: Arnold Amateur Strongman World Championships 
Dates:  2, 3 March 2018

Columbus, Ohio (Greater Columbus Convention Center, Arnold EXPO Stage)

2019: Arnold Amateur Strongman World Championships 
Dates:  2, 3 March 2019

Columbus, Ohio (Greater Columbus Convention Center, Arnold EXPO Stage)

2020: Arnold Amateur Strongman World Championships 
Dates:  7, 8 March 2020

Columbus, Ohio (Greater Columbus Convention Center, Arnold EXPO Stage)

2022: Arnold Amateur Strongman World Championships 
Dates:  4, 6 March 2022
Columbus, Ohio (Greater Columbus Convention Center, Arnold EXPO Stage)

References

External links 
 Official Arnold Strongman Classic website
 Arnold Sports Festival

Arnold Schwarzenegger
Strongmen competitions
Recurring sporting events established in 2002